Irish Whiskey is the third of the Nuala Anne McGrail series of mystery novels by Roman Catholic priest and author Father Andrew M. Greeley.

1998 American novels
Nuala Anne McGrail series
Novels by Andrew M. Greeley
Forge Books books